The Animal Health Act 1981 is a piece of UK legislation that provides powers for the control of outbreaks of avian influenza and Newcastle disease. These powers were extended by a statutory instrument. It was amended by the Animal Health and Welfare Act 1984. It was amended in 2002 to provide more powers to deal with foot and mouth disease, a problem that in 2001 bedevilled herds during the Blair ministry.

The Act provides for:
 slaughter of diseased poultry, poultry suspected of disease, poultry exposed to disease and poultry which the government thinks should be slaughtered to prevent the spread of disease
payment of compensation for birds that are slaughtered but are not diseased.
publication of a slaughter protocol prior to exercising the power to impose a preventive or firebreak cull. Emergency vaccination would have to be considered prior to any cull, and, if not used, the reasons would have to be published.
powers for veterinary inspectors to enter premises to ascertain whether disease anti-bodies exist, whether any animal is or was infected with disease and whether any causative agent of disease is present
publication of biosecurity guidance
preparation and review of a national contingency plan

References

United Kingdom Acts of Parliament 1981
History of agriculture in the United Kingdom
Agricultural health and safety
Food law
Disease outbreaks in the United Kingdom
Poultry diseases
Animal viral diseases
Animal virology
Bird diseases
Avian influenza